Joseph Hodgson (fl. 1933–1939) was an English footballer who made 183 appearances in the Football League playing as a left half for Darlington in the 1930s. He joined Darlington from Easington Colliery.

References

Notes

Year of birth missing
Year of death missing
People from South Moor
Footballers from County Durham
English footballers
Association football wing halves
Easington Colliery A.F.C. players
Darlington F.C. players
English Football League players